The men's Keirin event at the 2020 Summer Olympics took place on 7 and 8 August 2021 at the Izu Velodrome. 30 cyclists from 18 nations competed.

The medals were presented by Yasuhiro Yamashita,  IOC member, Olympian, 1 Gold Medal, Japan; and the medalists' bouquets were presented by Dato' Amarjit Singh Gill, UCI Management Committee Member,  Malaysia.

Background

This will be the 6th appearance of the event, which has been held at every Summer Olympics since its introduction in 2000.

The reigning Olympic champion is Jason Kenny of Great Britain; Great Britain has won three consecutive titles in the event (Chris Hoy was the winner in 2008 and 2012). The reigning (2020) World Champion is Harrie Lavreysen of the Netherlands.

Russia, Germany, China, Great Britain, Australia, and the Netherlands are traditionally strong track cycling nations. A preview at Olympics.com also identified Azizulhasni Awang of Malaysia, the 2016 Olympic bronze medalist and 2017 World Champion, as a significant contender.

Qualification

A National Olympic Committee (NOC) could enter up to 2 qualified cyclists in the men's Keirin. Quota places are allocated to the NOC, which selects the cyclists. Qualification is entirely through the 2018–20 UCI nation rankings. The eight nations that qualify for the team sprint event may enter two cyclists each in the Keirin (as well as the individual sprint). The nations that qualify a cyclist through the individual sprint rankings may also enter that cyclist in the Keirin. Finally, seven places are allocated through the Keirin rankings. Because qualification was complete by the end of the 2020 UCI Track Cycling World Championships on 1 March 2020 (the last event that contributed to the 2018–20 rankings), qualification was unaffected by the COVID-19 pandemic.

Competition format

Keirin races involve up to 7 cyclists each (though the 2020 format has no races with more than 6). The cyclists follow a pace motorcycle for 3 laps (750 m); the motorcycle then pulls away and the cyclists race for another 3 laps. These distances are changed from the 2016 Games, shortening the paced section from 5.5 laps and lengthening the unpaced sprint from 2.5 laps. The motorcycle starts at 30 km/h and increases speed to 50 km/h before it pulls off.

The tournament consists of four main rounds (up from three in 2016) and a repechage:

 First round: Five heats of 6 cyclists each. The top 2 cyclists in each heat (10 total) advance to the second round; all others (20 cyclists) go to the repechage.
 Repechage: Four heats of 5 cyclists each. The top 2 cyclists in each heat (8 total) rejoin the first-round winners in the second round. The other 12 cyclists are eliminated.
 Second round: Three heats of 6 cyclists each. The top 4 cyclists in each heat (12 total) advance to the semifinals. The remaining 6 cyclists are eliminated.
 Semifinals: Two heats of 6 cyclists each. The top 3 cyclists in each semifinal (6 total) advance to Final A; the bottom 3 cyclists from each semifinal go to Final B, out of medal contention.
 Finals: Two finals. Final A consists of the top 6 cyclists, awarding medals and 4th through 6th place. Final B ranks the next 6 cyclists from 7th to 12th.

Schedule
All times are Japan Standard Time (UTC+9)

Results

First round

Heat 1

Heat 2

Heat 3

Heat 4

Heat 5

Repechages

Heat 1

Heat 2

Heat 3

Heat 4

Quarterfinals

Heat 1

Heat 2

Heat 3

Semifinals

Heat 1

Heat 2

Finals

Final A

The Keirin final was won by Jason Kenny in what would be his last race, riding in position one behind the derny, and taking advantage of the nervous Matthew Glaetzer in second wheel to create a gap of a few bikelengths over the field as the derny prepared to pull off. Kenny then launched a highly unusual and ferocious breakaway attack immediately as the derny left the track, putting half a lap into his rivals before they were fully aware what had happened. Despite a frenzied chase led by Dutch sprint and team sprint gold medalist Harrie Lavreysen, seeking to replicate the sprint 'triple crown' previously won by Kenny in 2016 and Chris Hoy in 2008, Kenny was able to hold off the field, winning the event by the length of a straight. The gold medal made Kenny the most successful British Olympian, and the most successful Olympic cyclist, in history. It also made Kenny one of the elite number of Olympians to have successfully defended an Olympic gold medal in three different events (in Kenny's case, team sprint between 2008-2016, sprint between 2012-2016 and keirin between 2016-2020), the others being Michael Phelps, Ray Ewry, Larisa Latynina, Jenny Thompson and Sawao Kato.

Final B

See also
Cycling at the 2020 Summer Olympics – Women's keirin
Keirin

References

Men's Keirin
Cycling at the Summer Olympics – Men's keirin
Men's events at the 2020 Summer Olympics